The 1954 Claxton Shield was the 15th annual Claxton Shield, and was held in Melbourne. The participants were South Australia, New South Wales, Victoria, Western Australia and Queensland. The series was won by Victoria, defeating previous champions New South Wales 6–5, claiming their fourth Shield title.

References

1954 in baseball
1954 in Australian sport
1954
July 1954 sports events in Australia
August 1954 sports events in Australia